The Waiaua River is a river of the Bay of Plenty Region of New Zealand's North Island.

See also
List of rivers of New Zealand

References

Rivers of the Bay of Plenty Region
Rivers of New Zealand